Balaustium graminum is a species of mite belonging to the family Erythraeidae. This mite is very closely related to and similar to Balaustium medicagoense but has two (rather than one) pairs of eyes and is less densely hairy.

The adult is associated with various grasses in the vicinity of Grabouw, South Africa.

References
Nine new species of the superfamily Erythraeoidea (Acarina: Trombidiformes) associated with plants in South Africa, Magdalena K.P. Meyer & P.A.J. Ryke, Acarologia I

Trombidiformes
Animals described in 1959
Endemic fauna of South Africa